Brad A. Molnar (born April 14, 1950) is an American politician and former businessman serving as a member of the Montana Senate from the 28th district. Elected in November 2020, he assumed office on January 4, 2021.

Early life and education 
Molnar was born in Walkerton, Indiana and raised in Laurel, Montana. He studied forestry and journalism at the University of Montana, but did not earn a degree.

Career 
Molnar owned and operated a building construction company for 33 years. He served as a member of the Montana House of Representatives from 1993 to 1999 and the Montana Public Service Commission from 2005 to 2011. He was elected to the Montana Senate in November 2020 and assumed office on January 4, 2021.

References 

Living people
1950 births
People from St. Joseph County, Indiana
People from Yellowstone County, Montana
Republican Party members of the Montana House of Representatives
Republican Party Montana state senators